Baron Montalembert (or Baron Montelambert, or Montlambert, or Montelambert, or other variations) was launched in France in 1784, probably under another name. She was taken in prize, and first appeared in Lloyd's List in 1795, sailing as a West Indiaman. Between 1799 and 1802 she made two voyages as slave ship in the triangular trade in enslaved people. She was lost in 1802 during her second slave voyage, together with most of the slaves she was carrying.

Career
Lloyd's List reported in October 1795 that Baron Montilambert had arrived at Carthagena from Jamaica. Then it reported that Baron Monte Lambert, Perry, master, had put into Ilfracombe in distress and would have to unload. She had been on her way from the West Indies to London. From Ilfracombe Montelambert sailed to Belfast. Montelamert, Perry, master, had to cut away her masts in a gale of wind at Belfast. She was on her way from Jamaica to Liverpool. By end-April 1796 she had arrived at Liverpool.
 
Montalembert first appeared in the 1796 volume of Lloyd's Register (LR).

Montalambert appeared in the 1800 volume of the Register of Shipping.<ref name=RS1800>{{Cite web |url=https://hdl.handle.net/2027/mdp.39015021233591?urlappend=%3Bseq=251 |title=RS (1800), Seq.no.M562. |access-date=2 September 2022 |archive-date=6 February 2023 |archive-url=https://web.archive.org/web/20230206011521/https://babel.hathitrust.org/cgi/imgsrv/html?id=mdp.39015021233591;seq=249 |url-status=live }}</ref>

1st slave voyage (1799–1801): Captain William Thomas sailed from Liverpool on 26 December 1799. Baron Montlambert acquired slaves at Cape Mount. On 20 October 1800 she arrived at Suriname with 247 slaves. She sailed for Liverpool and arrived at Saint Kitts on 20 January 1801, having suffered damage. She arrived at Liverpool on 14 March. On her way she ran aground on the Hoyle Bank, in Liverpool Bay. She had left Liverpool with 42 crew members and suffered six crew deaths on her voyage.

2nd slave voyage (1801–Loss): Captain Alexander Stuart sailed from Liverpool on 12 October 1801. Apparently he was discharged on 5 January 1802. His replacement was Captain William Kermod(e). Baron Montlambert arrived at St Vincent on 13 July 1802. She may have landed 79 slaves there.

In August 1802 Lloyd's List reported that Baron Montalambert had arrived at St Vincent from Africa and had sailed for the Bahamas.

Fate
In 1802 Baron Montlambert'' was wrecked off Crooked Island, Bahamas, with the loss of all on board, including over 300 slaves. Reportedly, her captain, first, second, and third officers had all died before she arrived at St Vincent. She was lost sailing from St Vincent to New Providence.

Notes

Citations

References
 

1784 ships
Ships built in France
Age of Sail merchant ships of England
Liverpool slave ships
Maritime incidents in 1801
Maritime incidents in 1802
Ships lost with all hands